Silver acetylide is an inorganic chemical compound with the formula Ag2C2, a metal acetylide. The compound can be regarded as a salt of the weak acid, acetylene. The salt's anion consists of two carbon atoms linked by a triple bond. The alternate name "silver carbide" is rarely used, although the analogous calcium compound CaC2 is called calcium carbide. Silver acetylide is a primary explosive.

Synthesis 

Silver acetylide can be produced by passing acetylene gas through a solution of silver nitrate:

2  (aq) +  (g) →  (s) + 2  (aq)

The reaction product is a greyish to white precipitate. This is the same synthesis from Berthelot in which he first found silver acetylide in 1866.

The double salt is formed in acidic or neutral silver nitrate solutions. Performing the synthesis in basic ammonia solution does not allow the double salt to form, producing pure silver acetylide. To properly form the double salt, acetylene gas is passed through dilute silver nitrate and nitric acid solution. Instead of the conventional synthesis of passing acetylene gas through silver nitrate solution, a purer and whiter precipitate can be formed by passing acetylene gas through acetone and adding the acetylene solution drop-wise to a dilute silver nitrate and nitric acid solution. The reaction was performed at ambient room temperature.

Silver acetylide can be formed on the surface of silver or high-silver alloys, e.g. in pipes used for transport of acetylene, if silver brazing was used in their joints.

Explosive character 
Pure silver acetylide is a heat- and shock-sensitive primary explosive. Silver acetylide decompose through the reaction:

 (s) → 2 Ag (s) + 2 C (s)

The detonation velocity of the silver acetylide-silver nitrate double salt is 1980 m/s, while that of pure silver acetylide is 1200 m/s.

Solubility 
Silver acetylide is not soluble in water and is not appreciably soluble in any other solvent.

References 

Organosilver compounds
Acetylides
Explosive chemicals